Diego de los Cobos Molina (died 1565) was a Roman Catholic prelate who served as Bishop of Jaén (1560–1565) and Bishop of Ávila (1559–1560).

Biography
Diego de los Cobos Molina was born in Ubeda, Spain.
On 2 August 1559, he was appointed during the papacy of Pope Paul IV as Bishop of Ávila.
On 4 September 1560, he was appointed during the papacy of Pope Pius IV as Bishop of Jaén.
He served as Bishop of Jaén until his death in Toledo, Spain on 8 September 1565.
 
While bishop, he was the principal co-consecrator of Diego de Covarrubias y Leiva, Archbishop of Santo Domingo (1560).

References

External links and additional sources
 (for Chronology of Bishops) 
 (for Chronology of Bishops) 
 (for Chronology of Bishops)
 (for Chronology of Bishops)

16th-century Roman Catholic bishops in Spain
Bishops appointed by Pope Paul IV
Bishops appointed by Pope Pius IV
1565 deaths